São Sebastião do Umbuzeiro is the southernmost town in the Brazilian state of Paraíba.

References 

Municipalities in Paraíba
Populated places established in 1959